Tarabo is a municipal city in Rupganj Upazila in Narayanganj District, Bangladesh. The city has a population of 91,131. BSCIC Industrial Town and Research Centre is located at Tarabo municipality.

References

Rupganj Upazila
Towns in Bangladesh